The Flett Crags are rock crags on the north slope of the Read Mountains,  north of Mount Wegener, in the Shackleton Range, Antarctica. They were photographed from the air by the U.S. Navy in 1967, and surveyed by the British Antarctic Survey, 1968–71. In association with the names of geologists grouped in this area, they were named by the UK Antarctic Place-Names Committee after Sir John Smith Flett, a British geologist who worked on Scottish geology and volcanoes; he was Director of the Geological Survey and Museum of Practical Geology (later the British Geological Survey), 1920–35.

References 

Cliffs of Coats Land